This is a list of seasons completed by the UNLV Runnin' Rebels men's college basketball team.

Seasons

  Grgurich resigned after going 2–5, 0–2 in conference. Edwards went 5–9 and Landa went 5–2.
  Bayno went 3–4, while Good went 13–9 and 7–7 in conference.
  Charlie Spoonhour went 12–9 and 4–6 in conference. Jay Spoonhour went 6–4 and 4–2 in conference.
  Rice went 9–7 and 0–3 in conference. Simon went 9–8 and 8–7 in conference.

References

 
UNLV Runnin' Rebels
UNLV Runnin' Rebels basketball seasons